Eddie Dekel (born September 28, 1958) is an Israeli-American economist. He is a professor at Northwestern University and Tel Aviv University. His fields of research include game theory and decision theory.

Born in New York City, Dekel studied economics and statistics at Tel Aviv University before earning a PhD in economics from Harvard University under supervision of Andreu Mas-Colell.

In 1996, he was elected a Fellow of the Econometric Society.

References 

1958 births
Living people
20th-century American economists
21st-century American economists
Game theorists
Harvard Graduate School of Arts and Sciences alumni
Northwestern University faculty
Fellows of the American Academy of Arts and Sciences
Fellows of the Econometric Society
Economics journal editors